The English family name Payne originates in France as a variation of the name Payen (Payen; Payens or Payns). The name was brought to the British Isles as a result of the Norman Conquest of England, and is now common in English-speaking countries. Hugues de Payens from the town of Payns near Troyes moved to London in 1128 to set up a house for the Knights Templar in England.

People surnamed Payne

A
Aaron Payne (born 1982), Australian rugby league footballer
Adreian Payne (1991–2022), American basketball player
Alexander Payne (born 1961), U.S. film director and screenwriter
Anthony Payne (1936–2021), English composer, critic and musicologist
A. R. Payne, British rubber scientist and namesake of the Payne effect

B
Basil Payne (1923–2012), Irish poet and writer
Ben Iden Payne (1881–1976), English actor and director
Bert Payne, American curler
Bill Payne, American pianist
Billy Payne, American advocate and golf administrator 
Britton Payne, American curler
Bruce Payne (born 1958), British actor
Buckner H. Payne (1799-1889), American clergyman, publisher and racist pamphleteer.
Bruce Ryburn Payne (1874-1937), American educator; founding president of Peabody College (now part of Vanderbilt University) from 1911 to 1937

C
Cameron Payne (born 1994), American basketball player
Candie Payne, English singer-songwriter
Carl Anthony Payne II (born 1969), American actor best known for playing Cole Brown on the FOX series Martin
C. D. Payne (C. Douglas Payne), U.S. novelist
Cecil Payne, American saxophonist
Cecilia Payne-Gaposchkin (1900–1979), British-American astronomer
C. F. Payne (Chris Fox Payne, born 1954), American illustrator
Charlotte Payne (born 2002), British hammer thrower
Chrisette Michele Payne, better known under her stage name Chrisette Michele (born 1982), American singer and songwriter
Craig Payne boxer
Cynthia Payne (born 1932), British madam

D
Dan Payne, Canadian actor
Daniel Payne (1811-1893), American bishop, educator, college administrator and author
Daron Payne (born 1997), American football player
David Payne (disambiguation), several people
Davy Payne (c. 1949–2003), Northern Irish loyalist
Dolley Madison (née Payne) (1768–1849), First Lady of the United States
Don Payne (writer), American TV and film writer and producer
Donald Payne (disambiguation), several people
Dougie Payne, bassist and vocalist for band Travis
Douglas Payne (1875–1965), British actor

E
Eddie Payne, American college basketball coach
Eddie N. Payne (1873-1951), American politician
Edgar Alwin Payne (1883–1947), Landscape painter, muralist, Western American artist
Edna Payne, American actress
Ernest Payne (1884–1961), English cyclist and Olympic gold medallist
Ethan Payne, English YouTuber, streamer, and internet personality
Ethel L. Payne (1911–1991), African-American journalist

F
Fernandus Payne (1881–1977), American zoologist
Franklin Payne, American politician, Missouri state senator
Freda Payne (born 1942), American singer and actress
Frederick G. Payne (1904–1978), American politician

G
Gareth Payne (1935–2004), Welsh rugby player

H
Harry Payne (disambiguation), several people
Henry Payne (disambiguation), several people
Howard Payne (disambiguation), several people
Howie Payne, English singer-songwriter
Humfry Payne (1902–1936), English archaeologist

J
Jira Payne, American politician
John Payne (disambiguation), several people named John or Johnny
Jack Payne (disambiguation), several people
Jody Payne (1936–2013), American guitarist and musician, with Willie Nelson
Joe Payne (1984–2020), American heavy metal bassist and guitarist, member of the band Divine Heresy
Joe Payne (footballer, born 1914) (1914–1975), English footballer
J. Carroll Payne (1855–1936), American lawyer
Joseph Payne (1808–1876), English educationalist
Joseph Payne (musician) (1937–2008), English harpsichordist, organist and musicologist
Joseph Payne (cricketer) (1829–1880), English cricketer

K
Katharine Payne (born 1937), bioacoustics researcher
Keri-Anne Payne (born 1987), South African-born British swimmer
Keith Payne (born 1933), Vietnam veteran, Australian recipient of the Victoria Cross
Kevin Payne (disambiguation), several people
King Payne, Seminole chief

L
Les Payne, American journalist
Lewis Payne, alias of Lewis Powell (conspirator) (1844–1865), Lincoln assassination conspirator
Lewis S. Payne (1819–1898), New York politician
Liam Payne (born 1993), British singer with the band One Direction
Louis Payne (1873 – 1954), American character actor 
Luke Payne, American college basketball coach and former player

M
Mandy Payne, British artist
Marise Payne, Australian Senator
Marita Payne, Canadian athlete
Michael Gustavius Payne (born 1969), Welsh painter
Michelle Payne (born 1985), Australian jockey

N
Naomi Payne, British archaeologist
Nicolle Payne, American Olympic water polo goalkeeper

O
Odie Payne, American blues drummer

P
Patricia Payne (screenwriter), Australian screenwriter and film producer
Patricia Payne (mezzo-soprano) (born 1942), New Zealand opera singer
Pierre Stephen Robert Payne, novelist, historian and biographer

Q
Quorey Payne (born 1982), American football player

R
Roger Payne, biologist and environmentalist
Ron Payne (1925-2015), Australia politician.
Ronald Payne (1926-2013), British journalist and espionage author
Rosanna Catherine Payne (1884-1954), American politician
Russell Payne (author), English writer and artist
Rufus Payne, American blues musician

S
Sally Payne, American actress
Sam Payne, stage name used by Danish singer Gustav Winckler
Sara Payne (born 1969), British campaigner
Sarah Payne (1992–2000), British murder victim, see Murder of Sarah Payne
Scherrie Payne (born 1944), American singer, member of The Supremes
Sean Payne, drummer for British band The Zutons
Stanley G. Payne, historian of modern Spain and European fascism
Stefan Payne, Football Player (Born 1991)
Stephen Payne (disambiguation), several people
Steve Payne (disambiguation), several people
Sylvia Payne, physician

T
Theodore Payne, American horticulturist
Thomas Payne (disambiguation), several people
Tim Payne (disambiguation), several people
Tony Payne, American darts player
Trip Payne, American puzzle designer

V
Virginia Payne, American radio actress

W
William H. Payne (1836-1907), American educator and translator

Z
Zach Payne, Indiana politician and businessman

See also
Paine (surname)
Payn, a list of people with the surname

English-language surnames